Jadunath Majumdar, Rai Bahadur (October 1859–23 October 1932) was an Indian journalist and writer. He was the editor of the Tribune in Lahore, United India, and the Hindu Patrika of Jessore. Majumdar was the founder of the journal, Sanmilani, in Jessore. He was also a member of the first Legislative Assembly and the Bengal Legislative Council.

He was born in October 1859 in Lohagara,Narail. He died on 23 October 1932 at Rajbati Magura then a subdivision of Jessore district of undivided Bengal (now in Bangladesh).

References

20th-century Indian journalists
Rai Bahadurs
1859 births
1932 deaths